Phytocrene is a genus of flowering plants belonging to the family Icacinaceae.

Its native range is Bangladesh to New Guinea.

Species:

Phytocrene anomala 
Phytocrene borneensis 
Phytocrene bracteata 
Phytocrene hirsuta 
Phytocrene integerrima 
Phytocrene interrupta 
Phytocrene macrophylla 
Phytocrene oblonga 
Phytocrene palmata 
Phytocrene racemosa 
Phytocrene trichura

References

Icacinaceae
Asterid genera